Albert Edward Philip Henry Yorke, 6th Earl of Hardwicke, DL (14 March 1867 – 29 November 1904), styled Viscount Royston between 1873 and 1897, was a British diplomat and Conservative politician.

Background
Hardwicke was the only son of Charles Yorke, 5th Earl of Hardwicke, and Lady Sophia Georgiana Robertina, daughter of Henry Wellesley, 1st Earl Cowley.

Diplomatic and political career
Hardwicke was an Honorary Attaché in Vienna between 1886 and 1891. He entered the House of Lords on the death of his father in 1897 and made his maiden speech in February 1898. He served under Lord Salisbury and Arthur Balfour as Under-Secretary of State for India between 1901 and 1902 and again from 1903 until his death, and under Balfour as Under-Secretary of State for War between August 1902 and 1903. He made his last speech in the House of Lords in August 1904, three months before his death. Apart from his career in national politics he was a member of the London County Council between 1897 and 1901 and a deputy lieutenant of Cambridgeshire.

Personal life
Lord Hardwicke died in November 1904, aged only 37. He was unmarried and was succeeded in the earldom by his uncle, John Manners Yorke.

References

External links

1867 births
1904 deaths
Deputy Lieutenants of Cambridgeshire
6
Members of London County Council
Albert
Place of birth missing